Matthias Beckmann (born October 5, 1984) is a German jazz trumpeter and flugelhornist, instructor, composer and arranger.

Beckmann was born in Münster, North Rhine-Westphalia and began playing trumpet in a trombone choire as a child. Then he studied music at the Royal Conservatory of The Hague and ArtEZ Conservatorium Enschede under
Eric Vloeimans. He joined several master classes amongst others  with Ack van Rooyen and Till Brönner.

Matthias Beckmann worked in projects with Dr. Ring-Ding, Roger Trash, Markus Wentz and the Soulband "Soulfamily". He plays a B5 trumpet and a BR2 fluegelhorn from Hub van Laar.

Awards 
 Winner  at Jugend jazzt NRW (2005)

Discography 
 Mpenzi Wangu (2017 Mons Records)

References

External links 
 website in German
 discographie at allmusic
 Artis page at Van Laar

1984 births
Living people
People from Münster
German jazz trumpeters
Male trumpeters
21st-century trumpeters
21st-century German male musicians
German male jazz musicians